French Guinea was a French colonial possession in West Africa. Its borders, while changed over time, were in 1958 those of the current independent nation of Guinea.

French Guinea was established by France in 1891, within the same borders as its previous colony known as Rivières du Sud (1882–1891). Prior to 1882, the coastal portions of French Guinea were part of the French colony of Senegal.

In 1891, Rivières du Sud was placed under the colonial lieutenant governor at Dakar, who had authority over the French coastal regions east to Porto-Novo (modern Benin). In 1894 Rivières du Sud, Cote d'Ivoire and Dahomey were separated into 'independent' colonies, with Rivières du Sud being renamed as the Colony of French Guinea. In 1895, French Guinea was made one of several dependent colonies and its Governor became one of several Lieutenant Governors who reported to a Governor-General in Dakar. In 1904, this federation of colonies was formalised as French West Africa. French Guinea, Senegal, Dahomey, Cote d'Ivoire and Upper Senegal and Niger, were each ruled by a lieutenant governor, under the Governor General in Dakar.

Colonial history

Guinea was ruled by France until 1958. It became independent from France in 1958 following its voters' rejection of Charles de Gaulle's Constitution of 1958. At the time French Guinea was the only colony to reject the new constitution. French Guinea became the modern-day country of Guinea, keeping French as its official language.

See also
 Guinea
 History of Guinea
 French West Africa
 List of French possessions and colonies
 Timeline of Conakry

References

Jean Suret-Canale. French Colonialism in Tropical Africa 1900–1945. Trans. Pica Press (1971) 
Jean Suret-Canale. Guinea in the Colonial System, in Essays on African History. Translated, Hurst (1980)

 
French West Africa
French Guinea
Guinea
History of Guinea
French Guinea
States and territories established in 1894
States and territories disestablished in 1958
1894 establishments in French West Africa
1958 disestablishments in French West Africa
19th century in Guinea
20th century in Guinea